Jane Brigode (born Jane Ouwerx; 30 May 1870 – 3 May 1952) was a Belgian liberal and politician. From 1940 until 1945 she was co-president of the Liberal Party. In 1921, she and Marthe Boël founded the Union des femmes libérales de l’arrondissement de Bruxelles and in 1923 they founded, together with Alice De Keyser-Buysse, the National Federation of Liberal Women.

Honours 
 Knight in the Order of Leopold.
 Officer in the Order of Leopold II.

References

Sources
 Presidents of the Belgian liberal party
 Jane Brigode

1870 births
1952 deaths
Belgian suffragists
People from Flemish Brabant
Belgian women in politics
Belgian women's rights activists